José Hurtado may refer to:
 José María Hurtado Ruiz-Tagle, Chilean politician
 José Hurtado (footballer), Ecuadorian footballer
 José Antonio Hurtado Gallegos, Mexican politician